Heathcoat-Amory is a double-barrelled English surname. Notable people with this surname include the following:

David Heathcoat-Amory (born 1949), English politician
Derick Heathcoat-Amory, 1st Viscount Amory (1899–1981), English politician
Sir John Heathcoat-Amory, 1st Baronet (1824–1914), English politician
Sir John Heathcoat-Amory, 3rd Baronet (1894–1972), English cricketer
Joyce Wethered, Lady Heathcoat-Amory (1901–1997), English golf champion
Ludovic Heathcoat-Amory, English first-class cricketer

See also
Amory (name)
Heathcoat-Amory baronets

Compound surnames
English-language surnames
Surnames of English origin